The Chaudiere River is a tributary of the Normandin River, flowing into the unorganized territory of Lac-Ashuapmushuan, Quebec, into the Regional County Municipality (MRC) of Le Domaine-du-Roy, in the administrative region of Saguenay-Lac-Saint-Jean, Quebec, Canada.

The Chaudière River flows in the townships of Vimont, Mance, Mignault and Aigremont. Forestry is the main economic activity of this valley; recreational tourism activities, second.

The route 167 (northwesterly) connecting Chibougamau to Saint-Félicien, Quebec intersects the lower (i.e., southerly) section of the river Chaudière. The Canadian National Railway runs along this road. The forest road R0210 serves the upper part of the river that it cuts near the mouth of the head lake; it also serves the eastern part of this valley.

The surface of the Chaudière River is usually frozen from early November to mid-May, however, safe ice circulation is generally from mid-November to mid-April.

Geography

Toponymy 
The name "Rivière Chaudière" was made official on December 5, 1968, at the Commission de toponymie du Québec, that is, at its creation.

Notes and references

See also 

Rivers of Saguenay–Lac-Saint-Jean
Le Domaine-du-Roy Regional County Municipality